PET100 homolog is a protein that in humans is encoded by the PET100 gene. Mitochondrial complex IV, or cytochrome c oxidase, is a large transmembrane protein complex that is part of the respiratory electron transport chain of mitochondria. The small protein encoded by the PET100 gene plays a role in the biogenesis of mitochondrial complex IV. This protein localizes to the inner mitochondrial membrane and is exposed to the intermembrane space. Mutations in this gene are associated with mitochondrial complex IV deficiency. This gene has a pseudogene on chromosome 3. Alternative splicing results in multiple transcript variants.

Structure 
The PET100 gene is located on the p arm of chromosome 19 in position 13.2 and spans 1,839 base pairs. The gene produces a 9.1 kDa protein composed of 73 amino acids. The encoded protein localizes to the inner mitochondrial membrane and is exposed to the intermembrane space. This protein's N-terminus is essential for mitochondrial localization. It assembles into a 300 kDA complex which is dependent on the mitochondrial membrane potential, accumulating over time.

Function 
The protein encoded by PET100 is involved in Complex IV biogenesis as a COX chaperone; it is required for interaction between MR-1S, PET117, and Complex IV.

Clinical significance 
In 8 patients of Lebanese origin living in Australia, a c.3G>C mutation in the PET100 gene caused Complex IV deficiency and Leigh syndrome. Symptoms included delayed psychomotor development, seizures, hypotonia, brain abnormalities, and elevated blood and cerebrospinal fluid lactate levels. In another patient of Pakistani origin, a homozygous c.142C>T mutation resulted in Complex IV deficiency with intrauterine growth retardation, metabolic and lactic acidosis, hypoglycemia, coagulopathy, elevated serum creatine kinase levels, seizures, and intraventricular cysts.

Interactions 
The encoded protein interacts with MR-1S and COX7A2.
This protein is required for MR-1S, PET117, and Complex IV to interact.

References

Further reading 

 
 
 

Human proteins
Genes on human chromosome 19